Motaz Ali Hassan Hawsawi (born 17 February 1992) is a Saudi Arabian professional footballer who currently plays as a defender for Al-Taawoun and the Saudi Arabia national team.

In May 2018 he was named in Saudi Arabia's preliminary squad for the 2018 FIFA World Cup in Russia.

Career
He started playing for Al-Ahli and was often described as one of the best defenders in the history of the club.

On January 11, 2022, he transferred for Al-Taawoun.

Career statistics

Club

International
Statistics accurate as of match played 25 June 2018.

Honours

Al Ahli
Saudi Crown Prince Cup : 2014–15
Saudi Professional League : 2015-16
King Cup : 2016
Saudi Super Cup : 2016

References

External links

1992 births
Living people
Saudi Arabian footballers
Al-Ahli Saudi FC players
Al-Taawoun FC players
Saudi Arabia international footballers
Association football defenders
2015 AFC Asian Cup players
Sportspeople from Jeddah
Saudi Arabia youth international footballers
Saudi Professional League players
2018 FIFA World Cup players